For Those Who Hunt the Wounded Down is a novel by David Adams Richards, published in 1993. It was the final volume in his Miramichi trilogy, which also included the novels Nights Below Station Street (1988) and Evening Snow Will Bring Such Peace (1990).

The novel centres on Jerry Bines, a charismatic but violent ex-convict, and his family.

The novel was a shortlisted finalist for the Governor General's Award for English-language fiction at the 1993 Governor General's Awards, and won the Thomas Head Raddall Award in 1994.

Film
The novel was later adapted by Credo Entertainment into a television film, which aired on CBC Television in 1996.

The film adaptation, directed by Norma Bailey, starred Callum Keith Rennie as Jerry Bines, Brent Stait as Gary, Michael Hogan as Alvin, Nancy Beatty as Franny and Laura Harris as Lucy.

For the film's screenplay, Richards won a Gemini Award for Best Writing in a Dramatic Program or Mini-Series, and a Writers Guild of Canada Award.

References

External links
 

Films directed by Norma Bailey
Novels by David Adams Richards
1993 Canadian novels
1996 television films
1996 films
CBC Television original films
New Canadian Library
Canadian drama television films
1990s Canadian films